Municipalities of Montenegro (LAU-1, ISO 3166-2:ME)
 Communes (Montenegrin: Mjesna zajednica)
 Settlements (Montenegrin: Naselje) (LAU-2)
 NUTS of Montenegro
 Regions of Montenegro

History
Former: Districts of Montenegro (srez)

In 1910 the Kingdom of Montenegro was divided into 10 oblasts and 56 captaincies.

See also
Municipalities of Montenegro
Cities and towns of Montenegro
Populated places of Montenegro
ISO 3166-2:ME